The Stockholm Saxophone Quartet (sv: Stockholms Saxofonkvartett) is a Swedish saxophone quartet dedicated to contemporary music. They have commissioned and performed more than 700 pieces written by some of the most established composers in the world. The group also co-arrange Sound of Stockholm - the biggest festival in Sweden for contemporary music. They have released several CDs on the public label "Phono Suecia" and have toured in both in Europe, South America and Africa.

Musicians
Mathias Karlsen Björnstad - soprano saxophone
Jörgen Pettersson - alto saxophone
Leif Karlborg - tenor saxophone
Linn Persson - baritone saxophone

Repertoire

Javier Alvarez
Ylva Q Arkvik
Sven-Erik Bäck
Csaba Deák
Karólína Eiríksdóttir
Anders Eliasson
Göran Gamstorp
Madeleine Isaksson
Johan Jeverud
Ingvar Karkoff
Maurice Karkoff
Mats Larsson Gothe
Christer Lindwall
Cristian Marina
Sten Melin
Arne Mellnäs
Jan W. Morthenson
Satoshi Ohmae
Kent Olofsson
Åke Parmerud
Matthew Peterson
Henri Pousseur
Karin Rehnqvist
Marie Samuelsson
Sven-David Sandström
Henrik Strindberg
Iannis Xenakis
Valton Beqiri
Helena Tulve : ECM "Öö"

Discography
 VIVAX (PSCD 32, 1990) Csaba Deák: Quintet for Alto Saxophone and String Quartet (1988). Soloist Jörgen Pettersson.
 STOCKHOLM SAXOPHONE QUARTET (CAP 21399, 1992). Works by nine Swedish composers.
 STOCKHOLM SYMPHONIC WIND ORCHESTRA (CAP 21414, 1992) Concerto for Alto Saxophone and Wind Orchestra. Soloist Jörgen Pettersson.
 SAXOPHONE CON FORZA (PSCD 81) Jörgen Pettersson. Works by eight Swedish composers.
STOCKHOLM SAXOPHONE QUARTET - LINKS (CAP 21517, 1997).
 ENCORES (PSSACD 146, 2004)

External links
  Officiell webbplats
  Phono Suecia

Sources
 http://www.classicalarchives.com/ensemble/425.html#tv=about
 http://www.sonoloco.com/rev/phonosuecia/146/encores.html

Contemporary classical music in Sweden